Ebenezer Charles O. Addy (born 5 November 1940) is a Ghanaian sociologist and former sprinter who competed in the 1964 Summer Olympics. He was married to Marian Ewurama Addy, a biochemist and the first Ghanaian woman to attain the rank of full professor of natural science.

References

External links
 

1940 births
Living people
Ghanaian male sprinters
Olympic athletes of Ghana
Athletes (track and field) at the 1964 Summer Olympics
Athletes (track and field) at the 1966 British Empire and Commonwealth Games
Commonwealth Games gold medallists for Ghana
Commonwealth Games medallists in athletics
Medallists at the 1966 British Empire and Commonwealth Games